Promise Everything is the third studio album by British rock band Basement. The band began recording with producer Sam Pura in April 2015. The album was released on 29 January 2016 through Run for Cover.

Background

Before the release of their second album Colourmeinkindness (2012), Basement announced a hiatus because of personal commitments. Guitarist Alex Henery later revealed it was due to vocalist Andrew Fisher wishing to become a certified teacher which required him to return to school for a period of a year and a half. Drummer James Fisher, Andrew's younger brother, was graduating from art school, and the rest of the members were working on their respective careers. Henery, meanwhile, was working as a videographer in Boston, Massachusetts for record label Run for Cover. In late January 2014, the group announced that they would be returning from their hiatus and would perform shows during the summer. The band recorded an EP, Further Sky, in secret before releasing it in July.

Production
In August 2014, Henery revealed the group was writing material for a new album. Although Henery was located in the US and the rest of the band was in the UK, they would send each other ideas. The group managed to have a few practice sessions before composing the album. Henry found it "a little tough", but the group managed to "[make] it work". In early April 2015, the band posted they had begun recording with producer Sam Pura. Recording took place at Assault and Battery 2 in England, while mixing would later be done by Pura at the Panda Studios in California. Brian Gardener mastered the recordings. The album's sound has been described as alternative rock, compared to American bands such as Jimmy Eat World, Failure, and Soundgarden. Henery later named American band Autolux as "the biggest influence" on the record as "they just had energy and had that distortion, but still had really cool melodies."

Release
On 19 October 2015, Basement's third album, Promise Everything, was announced for release and the artwork was revealed, which was done by R.V. On 28 October, "Promise Everything" was made available for streaming and was released as a single. In October and November, the band supported the Story So Far. On 10 December, "Oversized" was released as a single and a music video was released for it. A music video was released for "Aquasun" on 14 January 2016, which was directed by Henery. The song was released as a single on the same day, and released to American radio a week later. The album was made available for streaming on 22 January and was released through Run for Cover on 29 January. In February and March, the band went on a UK and Europe tour. The tour, which featured Tigers Jaw and Alex G as support acts, was the band's biggest tour so far.

In April and May, the band went to on a US tour with support from Turnstile, Defeater and Colleen Green. Following this, the band went on tour in Australia with support from Turnover and Break Even. The band toured the UK in July with support from Dinosaur Pile-Up and The Sun Days. In October and November, the band supported Bring Me the Horizon on their UK arena tour. In February and March 2017, the band went on a UK tour with support from Higher Power. A deluxe edition of the album was released on March 3 through Fueled by Ramen. The band supported Thursday on their reunion tour in the US throughout March and April. On 12 April, a music video was released for the new version of "Promise Everything". In June, the band performed at the Download Festival. In December, the band supported Frank Carter & The Rattlesnakes on their headlining UK tour. The  title track was made available as DLC in the video game Rock Band 4

Track listing

Personnel
Personnel per booklet.

Basement
 Ronan Crix – guitar
 Andrew Fisher – vocals
 James Fisher – drums
 Alex Henery – guitar
 Duncan Stewart – bass

Production
 Sam Pura – producer, engineer, mixing
 Brian Gardener – mastering
 R.V.  – artwork
 Mitch Pinney – photography
 Alex Henery – layout

Chart performance

References
Footnotes

Citations

Sources

External links

Promise Everything at YouTube (streamed copy where licensed)

2016 albums
Basement (band) albums
Run for Cover Records albums